The Empty Copper Sea (1978) is the 17th novel in the Travis McGee series by John D. MacDonald. In it, McGee looks into the apparent drowning of Hub Lawless in a boating accident. His $2 million insurance policy leads some to believe he has faked his death.

The title of the book is taken from a passage in Chapter 13 (on page 218 of the first printing of the hardcover edition).  The sentence reads "I turned my head and saw, beyond the shoulder of my beloved, the empty copper sea, hushed and waiting, as if the world had paused between breaths."

The novel was adapted as the television movie Travis McGee (1983), starring Sam Elliott. The film abandoned the Florida locales in favor of California.

Plot summary
A wealthy landowner/investor named Hub Lawless has disappeared off the west coast of Florida, supposedly fallen overboard during a storm and drowned. The captain of the boat, Van Harder, is blamed, having been found drunk and passed out when the boat returned to shore, but all is not as it appears and the dead man possibly faked his own death and is, instead, living in Mexico with a lover, avoiding the eventual failure of his businesses.

Harder comes to McGee, asking him to salvage his reputation as a boat captain. He has placed a value of $20,000 on his "good name" and has offered $10,000 to McGee in payments over time to find out the truth of what happened. McGee and Meyer travel to the Gulf Coast of Florida, undercover as investors, to find out the truth of what happened. Over the course of the investigation, McGee meets Gretel, who features prominently in the next book, The Green Ripper.

References

External links
Travis McGee TV Movie

1978 American novels
Travis McGee (novel series)
American novels adapted into films